Iota Arae, Latinized from ι Arae, is the Bayer designation for a star in the southern constellation of Ara. Based upon the Bortle Dark-Sky Scale, this means the star is visible to the naked eye from suburban skies.

This is an evolved giant star with a stellar classification of B2 IIIne. The 'e' notation indicates the spectrum displays emission lines, which means this is a Be star that is surrounded by hot, circumstellar gas. The Doppler effect from this rotation is causing the absorption lines to widen and become nebulous, as indicated by the 'n' notation in the stellar class.

Iota Arae has around 8.3 times the mass of the Sun and is shining brightly with 10,864 times the Sun's luminosity.
The General Catalog of Variable Stars classifies it as a BE variable star, ranging from visual magnitude 5.18 to 5.26 with a period of 13.36 hours. In a study of the Hipparcos data, it was found to vary in brightness by 0.054 in magnitude with no clear period.

References

External links
 HR 6451
 CCDM 17233-4728
 Image Iota Arae

157042
Arae, Iota
Ara (constellation)
B-type giants
Be stars
BD-47 11484
085079
6451